Aodh may refer to:

Aodh (given name) (Old and Middle Irish spelling Áed), a masculine given name
Aed (god), a god in Irish mythology